Utah Starzz is an American women’s soccer team, founded in 1999. The team is a member of the Women's Premier Soccer League, the third tier of women’s soccer in the United States and Canada. The team plays in the North Division of the Big Sky Conference. Prior to the 2009 season, they were known as the Utah Spiders.

The team plays its home games at Timpview High School Stadium on the grounds of Timpview High School in Provo, Utah. The club's colors are yellow, burgundy and black.

Year-by-year

Honors
 WPSL Champions 2003
 WPSL North Division Champions 2004
 WPSL Big Sky North Division Champions 2008

Coaches
  Joanna Barney -2008
  Mark Graham 2009–present

Stadiums
 Soaring Eagle Stadium, Draper, Utah -2008
 Timpview High School Stadium, Provo, Utah 2009–present

See also
 Utah soccer clubs

External links
 Official Site
 WPSL Utah Starzz page

Soccer clubs in Utah
Women's Premier Soccer League teams
Women's soccer clubs in the United States
Association football clubs established in 1999
Provo, Utah
1999 establishments in Utah
Women's sports in Utah